Fairfield Country Day School (FCDS) is a private, all-boys day school in Fairfield, Connecticut, United States. Founded in 1936 by Laurence W. Gregory, the School prepares boys in Grades K-9 for secondary school success.

Athletics
Athletics are important at FCDS. Lessons in sportsmanship, teamwork, competition, and how to win and lose gracefully are an integral part the program. All students participate in either team or intramural sports. K-3 students partake in sports during the regular school day. Beginning in the fourth grade, students take part in sports after school. 
Students in fourth and fifth grades play on intramural Blue and White teams which include football, soccer, ice hockey, basketball, baseball and lacrosse.
Sixth grade students participate in interscholastic sports against other schools in the area.
In grades seven through nine, boys can try out for and join junior varsity and varsity teams that compete in the Fairchester Athletic Association. These sports include soccer, flag football, cross country, ice hockey, basketball, baseball, lacrosse and squash.

Accreditation 
FCDS is accredited by the Connecticut Association of Independent Schools and approved by the Connecticut State Department of Education. FCDS is also a member of the National Association of Independent Schools, the Fairchester Independent Schools, and the International Boys' Schools Coalition (IBSC).

Notable alumni
Michael Weatherly, actor best known on television for his roles in NCIS and Dark Angel

References

External links

Boys' schools in the United States
Buildings and structures in Fairfield, Connecticut
Schools in Fairfield County, Connecticut
Educational institutions established in 1936
Private middle schools in Connecticut
Private elementary schools in Connecticut
1936 establishments in Connecticut